Muellerella pygmaea is a species of lichenicolous fungus in the family Verrucariaceae. It has a cosmopolitan distribution in Arctic-alpine areas and grows on the thallus and apothecia of a number of hosts.

Host species for Muellerella pygmaea include:

 Acarospora sp.
 Acarospora smaragdula
 Aspicilia calcarea
 Candelariella aurella
 Carbonea assentiens
 Lecanora alpigena
 Lecanora muralis
 Lecanora polytropa
 Lecidea grisella
 Lecidea lapicida
 Lecidea obluridata
 Tephromela atra
 Rhizocarpon geographicum
 Rusavskia elegans

References

Verrucariales
Fungi described in 1855
Taxa named by Gustav Wilhelm Körber
Fungi of Iceland